The 1st 10 Hours of Messina was a sports car race, held on 24 August 1952 in the street circuit of Messina, Italy.

Final standings
 Started:	39	
 Classified:	23

See also
 Messina Grand Prix (auto race that replaced it)

References

External links
 La 10 Ore di Messina, la storia 

10 Hours of Messina